Forest Heath was a local government district in Suffolk, England. Its council was based in Mildenhall.  Other towns in the district included Newmarket. The population of the district at the 2011 Census was 59,748.

The district's name reflected the fact that it contains parts of both Thetford Forest and the heathlands of Breckland.  The district was formed on 1 April 1974, under the Local Government Act 1972, by a merger of Newmarket Urban District and Mildenhall Rural District. Forest Heath district was merged with the borough of St Edmundsbury on 1 April 2019 to form a new West Suffolk district.

Forest Heath was the home to two of the largest United States Air Force (USAF) airbases in the UK: RAF Lakenheath and RAF Mildenhall, as well as the headquarters of British horse racing, Newmarket Racecourse.

Forest Heath had had a high suicide rate when compared to the rest of Suffolk, to the East of England and to England overall.  The reasons for this are unknown.

In the English indices of deprivation 2010 report published by the Department for Communities and Local Government, two parts of Forest Heath have the highest employment out of 32483 areas in England.

Governance
As of the 2015 Local Government Elections, the Conservatives held overall control of the District Council.

Communities
The district contains three market towns and twenty civil parishes.

Towns

Civil parishes

Education

The Shi-Tennoji School in UK in Herringswell, Forest Heath was in operation beginning in 1985, and ending on 17 July 2000.

References

External links

Forest Heath District Council

 
Non-metropolitan districts of Suffolk
Former non-metropolitan districts
West Suffolk District